Gonepteryx is a genus of butterflies  in the family Pieridae, which contains about 1,100 species. They live in Europe, Asia, and Northern Africa. They are commonly known as brimstones for the bright yellow colour of the wings of most species. These share the same name as the much larger tropical genus Anteos. These inhabit much of central and South America and also North America. This species are known for being the kings of butterfly longevity. 10-13 months is the lifespan for many temperate species. Anteos, however, is much shorter lived. The adults will often mimic ivy leaves at rest. Male brimstone butterflies can withstand cooler temperatures and are able to fly after just 4 months in hibernation. Female brimstone butterflies need warmer climates to survive, and therefore are in hibernation longer. The male butterflies have a longer life span as they are more resilient to a wider range of temperatures, unlike the female.

Species
It contains the following species:
 Gonepteryx acuminata (C. & R. Felder, 1862)
 Gonepteryx aspasia (Ménétriès, 1859)
 Gonepteryx amintha (Blanchard, 1871)
 Gonepteryx burmensis (Tytler 1926)
 Gonepteryx chitralensis (Moore, 1905)
 Gonepteryx cleobule (Hübner, 1824) – Canary brimstone
 Gonepteryx cleopatra (Linnaeus, 1767) – Cleopatra
 Gonepteryx eversi (Rehnelt, 1974
 Gonepteryx farinosa (Zeller, 1847) – powdered brimstone 
 Gonepteryx maderensis (Felder, 1862) – Madeira brimstone
 Gonepteryx mahaguru (Gistel, 1857) – lesser brimstone
 Gonepteryx maxima (Butler, 1885)
 Gonepteryx nepalensis (Doubleday, 1847)
 Gonepteryx palmae (Stamm 1963) – La Palma brimstone
 Gonepteryx rhamni (Linnaeus, 1758) – common brimstone
 Gonepteryx taiwana (Paravicini 1913)

References

 Gonepteryx, Tree of Life
 Gonepteryx, Encyclopedia of Life
Wiklund, C., Lindfors, V., & Forsberg, J. (1996). Early male emergence and reproductive phenology of the adult overwintering butterfly gonepteryx rhamni in Sweden. Oikos, 75(2), 227. https://doi.org/10.2307/3546246 

 
Pieridae genera
Taxa named by William Elford Leach
Taxonomy articles created by Polbot
Coliadinae